Maria Pawlikowska-Jasnorzewska, née Kossak (24 November 1891 – 9 July 1945), was a prolific Polish poet known as the Polish Sappho and "queen of lyrical poetry" during Poland's interwar period. She was also a dramatist.

Life

Born in Kraków into a family of painters, Maria Kossak grew up in the manor house known as the Kossakówka surrounded by artists, writers, and intellectuals. Her grandfather, Juliusz Kossak, and father, Wojciech Kossak, were both professional painters famous for their depictions of historical scenes and horses. Her younger sister, Magdalena Samozwaniec, was also a popular writer of satire.

Fluent in French, English, and German, in her youth, Kossak divided her time between painting and poetry. It was only during her marriage to Jan Pawlikowski — after the annulment of her first marriage to Władysław Bzowski — that her literary interests prevailed, inspired by the couple's discussions about her poetic output and the world of literature in general. Their passionate relationship based on shared interests and mutual love was an endless source of poetic inspiration for her. However, her second marriage also failed.

Following her divorce, Maria Pawlikowska became associated with the Warsaw-based Skamander group of poets: Julian Tuwim, Jan Lechoń, Kazimierz Wierzyński, and other renowned writers such as Jarosław Iwaszkiewicz, Irena Krzywicka, Kazimiera Iłłakowiczówna and Tadeusz Boy-Żeleński. In the inter-war period Pawlikowska-Jasnorzewska published twelve volumes of poetry and established herself as one of the most innovative poets of the era.

She began her career as a playwright in 1924, with her first farce, Archibald the Chauffeur, produced in Warsaw. By 1939 she had written fifteen plays whose treatment of taboo topics such as abortion, extramarital affairs, and incest provoked scandals. She was compared by critics to Molière, Marivaux, Oscar Wilde, George Bernard Shaw, and Witkacy.  Her plays depicted her unconventional approach to motherhood, which she understood as a painful obligation that ends mutual passion. She spoke in support of a woman's right to choose.

In 1939, at the onset of World War II, she followed her third husband, Stefan Jasnorzewski, to England. She was diagnosed with bone cancer in 1944, soon becoming hemiplegic, and on 9 July 1945 died in Manchester, cared for to the last by her husband. She is buried with her husband in Southern Cemetery, Manchester.

A Woman of Wonder

In 1937 Pawlikowska-Jasnorzewska wrote an anti-Nazi play, Baba-dziwo, which was translated into English by Elwira M. Grossman and Paul J. Kelly as A Woman of Wonder.

Works
 Niebieskie migdały, Kraków 1922
 Różowa magia, Kraków 1924
 Narcyz 1926
 Szofer Archibald. Comedy in 3 acts, premiere: Warsaw, The New Theatre 1924, publication: "Świat" 1924 (# 45–52)
 Kochanek Sybilli Thompson. Futuristic fantasy in 3 acts, premiere: Kraków, J. Słowacki Theatre 1926
 Pocałunki, Warsaw 1926
 Dancing. Karnet balowy, Warsaw 1927
 Wachlarz, Warsaw 1927
 Cisza leśna, Warsaw 1928
 Paryż, Warsaw 1929
 Profil białej damy, Warsaw 1930
 Egipska pszenica. Play in 3 acts, premiere: Kraków, J. Słowacki Theatre 1932
 Mrówki (myrmeis). Play in 3 acts, premiere: Kraków, J. Słowacki Theatre 1936
 Referat. Farce in 3 acts, premiere: Polish TV 1968, publication: "Dialog" 1979
 Zalotnicy niebiescy. Play in 3 acts, premiere: Warsaw, The New Theatre 1933, publication Kraków 1936
 Surowy jedwab, Warsaw 1932
 Powrót mamy. Comedy in 3 acts, premiere: Warsaw, The New Theatre 1935
 Śpiąca załoga, Warsaw 1933
 Dowód osobisty. Comedy in 3 acts, premiere: Warsaw, The New Theatre 1936
 Nagroda literacka. Comedy in 4 acts, premiere: Warsaw, The New Theatre 1937
 Balet powojów, Warsaw 1935
 Biedna młodość, radio play, Polish radio 1936
 Pani zabija pana, radio play, Polish radio 1936
 Krystalizacje, Warsaw 1937
 Złowrogi portret, radio play, Polish radio 1937
 Baba-dziwo. TragiComedy in 3 acts, premiere: Kraków, J. Słowacki Theatre 1938, publication: "Dialog" 1966
 Dewaluacja Klary. Comedy in 3 acts, premiere: Poznań, Teatr Polski 1939
 Popielaty welon. Fantazja sceniczna w 9 obrazach, premiere: Warsaw, Teatr Narodowy 1939
 Szkicownik poetycki. Warsaw 1939
 Gołąb ofiarny, poems, Glasgow 1941
 Róża i lasy płonące. London, 1941
 Czterolistna koniczyna albo szachownica. London, 1980

Awards
 Golden Laurel of the Polish Academy of Literature (1935)
 Literary prize of the city of Cracow (1937)

See also
List of Polish-language authors
List of Polish-language poets
Polish literature
Culture of Kraków
List of Poles

Notes

Further reading
 Mortkowicz-Olczakowa, Hanna (1961). Bunt wspomnień. Państwowy Instytut Wydawniczy.
 Maria Pawlikowska-Jasnorzewska, Motyle / Butterflies. Bilingual edition. Poezje wybrane/Selected Poems. Selected and translated by Barbara Bogoczek and Tony Howard. Afterword by Anna Nasilowska. Krakow: Wydawnictwo Literackie, 2000, 2007.

External links

Pawlikowska-Jasnorzewska: selected poems in translation including photographs at Buffalo University's InfoPoland
Maria Pawlikowska-Jasnorzewska at culture.pl
Maria Pawlikowska-Jasnorzewska collected works (Polish)
Maria Pawlikowska-Jasnorzewska: poems in translation and biographical material

Writers from Kraków
Golden Laurel of the Polish Academy of Literature
1891 births
1945 deaths
Polish women poets
Polish women dramatists and playwrights
20th-century Polish poets
20th-century Polish dramatists and playwrights
20th-century Polish women writers
Deaths from bone cancer
Deaths from cancer in England
Burials at Southern Cemetery, Manchester